Joseph Allen may refer to:

Clergy 

 Joseph Allen (bishop) (1770–1845), Bishop of Bristol and Bishop of Ely
 Joseph Allen (clergyman) (1790–1873), American clergyman
 Joseph Henry Allen (1820–1898), American Unitarian scholar and son of Joseph Allen (1790–1873)

Politics
Joseph Allen (congressman) (1749–1827), member of the eleventh U.S. Congress
Joseph Allen (Maine politician) (fl. 1907–1916), American politician from Maine
Joseph Allen (Australian politician) (1869–1933), member of the Western Australian Legislative Council
Joseph B. Allen, member of the Florida House of Representatives

Other
Joseph Allen (doctor of medicine) (1714–1796), doctor, circumnavigator, Master of Dulwich College
Joseph William Allen (1803–1852), English landscape painter and art teacher
Joseph H. Allen (1821–1884), colonel in the American Civil War and Supervisor of Brunswick, New York
Joseph G. Allen, public health expert
Joseph P. Allen (born 1937), NASA astronaut
Joseph P. Allen (psychologist), American psychologist and academic
H. Joseph Allen (born 1941), American businessman, racehorse owner and film producer
Joseph Allen, a fictional character in Call of Duty: Modern Warfare 2

See also
Joe Allen (disambiguation)
Joey Allen (born 1964), lead guitarist from the American glam metal band Warrant
Joey Allen (sailor), New Zealand sailor
Jo Allen (disambiguation)
Joseph Alleine (1634–1668), English Puritan Nonconformist pastor and author
Joseph Allan (fl. 1932–1933), rugby league footballer
Allen (surname)